Evžen, a Czech men's given name, may refer to:
Evžen Čermák (1932–2018), Czech alpine skier
Evžen Hadamczik (1939–1984), Czech football player and manager
Evzen Kolar (1950–2017), Czech film producer
Evžen Korec (born 1956), Czech scientist and businessman
Evžen Linhart (1898–1949), Czech architect and designer of furniture
Evžen Neustupný (born 1933), Czech archaeologist
Evžen Plocek (1929–1969), self-immolated protester
Evžen Rošický (1914–1942), Czech athlete and journalist
 (1925–1998), Czech theatre director and director
Evžen Tošenovský (born 1956), Czech politician
Evžen Vohák (born 1975), Czech footballer

Czech masculine given names